Bamberg could refer to:

Persons
 Otto of Bamberg
 Theodore Tobias Bamberg (1875–1963), magician, stagename Okito
 David (Fu Manchu) Bamberg (1904–1974), magician

Places
 Bamberg, a city in Bavaria
Bamberg (electoral district), a federal electoral district
 Bamberg (district), a district in Bavaria, Germany surrounding, but not including the city of Bamberg
 Bamberg, Ontario, Canada
 Bamberg, South Carolina, United States
 Bamberg County, South Carolina, United States
 Bamberg (crater), a crater on Mars

Other
 Bamberg Apocalypse
 Bamberg Magical Dynasty
 Brose Baskets Bamberg, a basketball club
 Psalter (Bamberg, Staatsbibliothek, MS A. I. 14)
 Archbishop of Bamberg
 Bishopric of Bamberg

See also 
 Bamberger
 Bamburgh
 Babergh (disambiguation)